LFZ may refer to:
Imperial Porcelain Factory, formerly Lomonosov Porcelain Factory, a producer of ceramics in Saint Petersburg, Russia
Lycée français Marie Curie de Zurich, a French school in Switzerland
Leonardo Franchi Zeclhynscki